Partha Chatterjee (born 6 October 1952) is an Indian politician who earlier served as the Minister of Commerce and Industries and formerly served as the Education Minister of Government of West Bengal. He represented the Trinamool Congress. He also held the political office of Secretary General of the All India Trinamool Congress. In 2022, he was arrested by the Enforcement Directorate in connection with the School Service Commission (SSC) scam in West Bengal.

Early life
Partha Chatterjee was born in Calcutta. His alma mater is Ramakrishna Mission Vidyalaya, Narendrapur though Some former students of the Narendrapur Ramakrishna Mission claimed that the suspended Trinamool Congress leader, Partha Chatterjee was only there for a year, after which he was given a transfer certificate.

He studied economics from Asutosh College and completed his MBA from IISWBM.

Political career
Partha Chatterjee worked as an HR professional with Andrew Yule.

He was elected as an MLA from Behala Paschim in 2001, and subsequently re-elected from the same constituency in 2006. In 2011 he won by a margin of 59,021 votes. He was Leader of the Opposition in the West Bengal Legislative Assembly from 2006 to 2011.

In 2016 and 2021 West Bengal assembly election he was re-elected from the same constituency.

He was sworn in as a Cabinet Minister under Chief Minister Mamata Banerjee on 20 May 2011 and allotted the portfolios of Commerce and Industry, Public Enterprises, Information Technology and Electronics and Parliamentary affairs.

He was nominated as deputy leader of the house in 2011. After the Assembly election 2016, he became the Minister-in-Charge of Higher Education and School Education Department, West Bengal Government and the Ministry of Commerce and Industry, Public Enterprises, Information Technology and Electronics replaced by Amit Mitra.

After 2021 West Bengal Assembly Election, once again the portfolios of Commerce and Industry, Information Technology and Electronics were given to him and the Ministry of Higher Education and School Education Department, West Bengal Government replaced him with Bratya Basu.

Controversy
On 23 July 2022, Chatterjee was arrested from his residence by the Enforcement Directorate in connection with the alleged State School Service Commission (SSC) recruitment scam cases along with his aide actress Arpita Mukherjee.  He was admitted to SSKM Hospital after complaining of chest pains.  Later, he was shifted to AIIMS Bhubaneswar where doctors said that he suffers from chronic diseases but does not need immediate hospitalization. He is currently in the custody of the Enforcement Directorate. As of 28 July 2022, the Enforcement Directorate has recovered ₹498 Million cash, gold worth ₹50.7 million, ₹5.6 million worth foreign currency and coded diaries from properties related to him and Arpita Mukherjee. On 28 July he was expelled from the cabinet Ministries he was in charge of and suspended from the TMC. On 5 August 2022, he and his aide Arpita Mukherjee were sent to jail custody.

On 28 July 2022, he was removed as the Minister of Commerce and Industry, Information Technology and Electronics and suspended from the All India Trinamool Congress.

References

1956 births
Living people
Trinamool Congress politicians from West Bengal
West Bengal politicians
Ramakrishna Mission schools alumni
Asutosh College alumni
Indian Institute of Social Welfare and Business Management alumni
University of Calcutta alumni
State cabinet ministers of West Bengal
Leaders of the Opposition in West Bengal